Tula Rud Rural District is a rural district (dehestan) in the Central District of Talesh County, Gilan Province, Iran. At the 2006 census, its population was 19,061, in 4,280 families. The rural district has 35 villages.

References 

Rural Districts of Gilan Province
Talesh County